Sin-1, SIN-1, sin-1, or sin−1 may refer to:

SIN-1, Linsidomine (3-morpholinosydnonimine), a drug acting as a vasodilator
 sin x−1 = sin(x)−1 = −(1−sin(x)) = −cvs(x) or negative coversine of x, the additive inverse (or negation) of an old trigonometric function
 sin−1y = sin−1(y), sometimes interpreted as arcsin(y) or arcsine of y, the compositional inverse of the trigonometric function sine (see below for ambiguity)
 sin−1x = sin−1(x), sometimes interpreted as (sin(x))−1 =  = csc(x) or cosecant of x, the multiplicative inverse (or reciprocal) of the trigonometric function sine (see above for ambiguity)
 sin x−1, sometimes interpreted as sin(x−1) = sin(), the sine of the multiplicative inverse (or reciprocal) of x (see below for ambiguity)
 sin x−1, sometimes interpreted as (sin(x))−1 =  = csc(x) or cosecant of x, the multiplicative inverse (or reciprocal) of the trigonometric function sine (see above for ambiguity)

See also
Inverse function
csc−1 (disambiguation)
cos−1 (disambiguation)